Henry Wotton or Wooton was the son of John Wotton of North Tudenham and Margaret Brampton. He was the brother of John Wotton of Tudenham, Norfolk, whose first wife was Elizabeth Le Strange (d.1536), the daughter of Robert le Strange and the sister of Sir Thomas Le Strange and whose second wife was Mary, daughter of George Neville, 5th Baron Bergavenny, and widow of Thomas Fiennes, lord Dacre of the South.

In 1578 Henry Wotton published a translation he had made from the French a collection of stories from Italian romances, interspersed with verse, entitled A Courtlie Controversie of Cupids Cautels containing five Tragicall Historyes by three Gentlemen and two Gentlewomen, translated out of French by Hen. Wotton, London, 1578, 4to. It was dedicated to the translator's sister-in-law, the Lady Dacre of the South. Two copies, both imperfect, are known—one is in the Bodleian Library, and the other, formerly belonging successively to George Steevens and to Corser, is now in the British Museum.

Commemorative windows 
A commemorative window celebrating the marriage of his parents, John Wotton and Margaret Brampton, can still be seen in St. Mary’s, the parish church of North Tuddenham, Norfolk.in a window on the south side, Wotton impaling Brampton, gules, a saltire, between four cross crosslets, fitche, argent 

Margaret's native Brampton also had glass work celebrating the marriage. Henry Wotton's father John Wotton also put up a commemorative window for his parents at St. Mary's, Henry Wotton's paternal grandparents, William Wotton, Baron of the Exchequer, and Ann Southwell, the daughter of Richard Southwell of Woodrising.In a window on the north side of the church, gules, a chevron, argent, between two crosslets, in chief, and an annulet in base, or, Wootton, impaling argent, three cinquefoils, gules, Southwell; the arms of William Wotton, Baron of the Exchequer, and his wife

A third Wotton shield, impaling Gules a saltire argent (Neville), was in a south nave window of St. Mary's at least until the eighteenth century. This celebrated the marriage of Henry Wotton's brother John to Mary Neville, the Lady Dacre Henry Wotton dedicated his work to. A fourth stained glass window the marriage of Wotton daughter to a man whose coat of arms was gules, a lion rampant, argent. By his brother John's first wife Elizabeth Lestrange, Henry Wotton had a nephew named John Wotton (dead 20 January 1546 at Calais in the service of the King) who married Elizabeth Berdewell (1511 – 20 February 1546), and had a daughter, Anne. Anne Wotton, Henry Wotton's grandniece, the great heiress, married successively Thomas Woodhouse of Hickling, Norfolk, son of Sir William Woodhouse, Henry Reppes of Mendham, Suffolk, the widower of Bess Holland, and Bassingbourne Gawdy.

References 

16th-century English writers